WSHU-FM (91.1 FM) is a NPR-affiliated radio station operated by Sacred Heart University. Licensed to Fairfield, Connecticut, it serves the Connecticut and Long Island area with news and classical music programming. Programs produced at WSHU and distributed nationally include Sunday Baroque.

Translators

See also 
 WSHU (AM) — 1260 AM, licensed to Westport, Connecticut
 WSUF — 89.9 FM, licensed to Noyack, New York

References

External links 
 

SHU-FM
WSHU-FM
Mass media in Fairfield County, Connecticut
Sacred Heart University
SHU-FM
Radio stations established in 1965
1965 establishments in Connecticut